Costoanachis hotessieriana is a species of sea snail, a marine gastropod mollusk in the family Columbellidae, the dove snails.

Description

Distribution

References

External links

Columbellidae
Gastropods described in 1842